Entodesmium is a genus of fungi in the family Lophiostomataceae.

References

External links
Index Fungorum

Lophiostomataceae